Ichneutica seducta is a moth of the family Noctuidae. This species is endemic to New Zealand. It is found only in the Chatham Islands and inhabits native forest. The life history of this species is unknown but the larval host species is likely to be Dracophyllum arboreum. The adults of this species are on the wing from November to January and are attracted to light.

Taxonomy 
This species was first described by Robert Hoare in 2019. The male holotype specimen was collected at Awatotara in the Chatham Islands by J. S. Dugdale and is held in the New Zealand Arthropod Collection.

Description 
This species is variable in colour ranging from a pale grey ochreous colour to a bright orange brown. It has a single colour thorax which does not have any marks, dark coloured hindwings and has a large S shaped kidney mark on its forewings. It is unlikely to be confused with other moths in its range but the male genitalia of this species is very similar to I. semivittata.

Distribution 
This species is endemic to New Zealand. This species is only known from the Chatham Islands and has been found on Chatham, Pitt and Rangatira Islands.

Habitat 
This species has been collected in Chatham Islands native forest.

Behaviour 
The adults of this species are on the wing from November to January and are attracted to light.

Life history and host species 
[[File:Dracophyllum arboreum 119299822.jpg|thumb|left|Dracophyllum arboreum"" the likely larval host species of I. seducta]]
The life history of this species is unknown but the larval host species is likely to be Dracophyllum arboreum''.

References

Moths described in 2019
Hadeninae
Moths of New Zealand
Endemic fauna of New Zealand
Fauna of the Chatham Islands
Taxa named by Robert Hoare
Endemic moths of New Zealand